Crni Potok is a village in central Croatia, in the municipality of Topusko, Sisak-Moslavina County.

Demographics
According to the 2011 census, the village of Crni Potok has 153 inhabitants. This represents 40.58% of its pre-war population according to the 1991 census.

According to the 1991 census,  77.45% of the village population were ethnic Serbs (292/377), 16.46% were ethnic Bosniaks (62/377), 1.59% were ethnic Croats (6/377), 0.26% were Yugoslavs (1/377) and 4.24% were of other ethnic origin (16/377).

Sights
 Monument to the uprising of the people of Kordun and Banija

See also 
 Glina massacres

References

Populated places in Sisak-Moslavina County